Wydawnictwa Szkolne i Pedagogiczne (WSiP; the company name has been variously translated as School and Pedagogical Publications, Scholastic and Pedagogical Publisher or Publishing House for School and Pedagogical Books) is a Polish educational book publisher founded in Warsaw, Poland, in 1945. 

The company has been described as "known to all Polish students and educators". It had a monopoly on textbook publishing in Poland from 1950s to 1989.

History
WSiP traces its history to 9 April 1945, when the Polish Ministry of Education established the National Organization of School Publications (Państwowe Zakłady Wydawnictw Szkolnych, PZWS). In 1951 a part of the PZWS was split off to eventually become the Polish Scientific Publishers PWN. During the communist era, it had the state monopoly on publishing school textbooks, and like all other publishers, its works were subject to censorship. 

In 1998 the company begun to be privatized, and in 2004 it debuted at the Warsaw Stock Exchange and it remained listed there until 2010 when it was converted into a Polish limited liability company (sp. z o.o.) and acquired by Advent International. In 2018 it was acquired from Advent International by the Central Group.

Activities
The company is known for publishing textbooks for Polish educational institutions, from elementary schools to university level, as well as scholarly books in the fields such as psychology and pedagogy. The company has also published encyclopedias, scholarly journals and online media, including educational portals as well as mobile applications.

References

Further reading
Wacław Pokojski, “Osiągnięcia i zadania WSiP w zakresie wydawnictw humanistyczno-społecznych” [The achievements and tasks of WSiP in the area of humanities and social sciences], Nowa Szkoła 11 (1975): 9–12;
 A.K., “Trzydziestolecie Wydawnictw Szkolnych i Pedagogicznych” [Thirtieth anniversary of the school and pedagogical publisher], Polonistyka 29, no. 1 (1976): 66; 
“O dorobku i zadaniach WSiP w zakresie wydawnictw humanistycznych. Rozmowa z redaktorem naczelnym Zakładu Wydawnictw Humanistycznych Jerzym Żółkiewskim, rozmawiała Alicja Kasprzycka” [On the achievements and tasks of WSiP in humanities: interview of Alicja Kasprzycka with the editor of the Humanities Division, Jerzy Żółkiewski], Polonistyka 33, no. 5 (1980): 323–26.

External links

 Official page of the company

1945 establishments in Poland
Publishing companies established in 1945
Book publishing companies of Poland
Companies based in Warsaw
Textbook publishing companies